The city of Islamabad, the capital of Pakistan, is located on the Pothohar Plateau within the Islamabad Capital Territory—one of the earliest known sites of human settlement in Asia. Some of the earliest Stone Age artifacts in the world have been found on the plateau, dating from 1 million to 500,000 years ago. The crude stones recovered from the terraces of the Soan River testify to the endeavours of early man in the inter-glacial period. Items of pottery and utensils dating back to prehistory have been found in several areas.

Limited excavations have confirmed evidence of prehistoric cultures. Relics and human skulls have been found dating back to 5000 BC that show this region was home to Neolithic man, who roamed the banks of the Soan River. During the Neolithic, people developed small communities in the region around 3000 BC. 
Situated at one end of the Indus Valley civilization, the area was an early habitation of the Aryan community in Central Asia. Their civilization flourished here between the 23rd and 18th centuries BC. Many great armies such as those of Alexander the Great, Genghis Khan, Timur and Ahmad Shah Durrani used the corridor through the region on their way to invade the Indian Subcontinent. A Buddhist town once existed in the region and remains of a stupa have been identified in the G-12 sector. Modern Islamabad also incorporates the old settlement of Saidpur. The British took control of the region from the Sikhs in 1849 and built Asia's largest cantonment in the region in Rawalpindi.

Construction and development 

When Pakistan gained independence in 1947, Karachi was its first capital. In 1960, Islamabad was constructed as a forward capital. It is considered by some as one of the most extensively and successfully planned cities in South Asia.

References